The S&P/TSX Composite Index is the benchmark Canadian index, representing roughly 70% of the total market capitalization on the Toronto Stock Exchange (TSX) with about 250 companies included in it. The Toronto Stock Exchange is made up of over 1,500 companies. It replaces the earlier TSE 300 index. On November 12, 2021 the S&P/TSX Composite Index reached an all-time closing high of 21,768.53. The intraday record high was made on November 16, 2021 at 21,796.16.

Eligibility

To be eligible for inclusion in the Composite Index: 
 Market capitalization: For eligibility any security must represent a minimum weight of 0.05% of the index. Moreover, the security must have a minimum weighted average price of at least C$1 over the past three months and over the last three trading days of the month-end prior to the exchange reviewing the index.
 Liquidity: The trading volume in terms of dollar value and the number of transactions must exceed at least 0.025% of the sum of all eligible securities' trading volume. To ensure that no single company dominates trading, they are capped at a maximum of 15% for value, volume and transactions.
 Domicile: Stocks must be listed on the Toronto Stock Exchange and be incorporated under Canadian laws.

Annual Returns 
The following table shows the annual development of the S&P/TSX Composite Index, which was calculated back to 1945.

List of companies
Effective prior to the open of trading on Monday, September 20, 2021.

Exchange-traded funds 
There are currently no ETFs that match the S&P/TSX Composite Index; however, the iShares S&P/TSX Completion Index Fund combined with the iShares S&P/TSX 60 Index Fund can give equivalent exposure. The iShares S&P/TSX Capped Composite Index Fund and BMO S&P/TSX Capped Composite Index Fund match the diversity of the index but the relative weighting of each constituent is capped at 10%.

BlackRock also provides several iShares-brand ETFs which provide exposure to segments of the index; these include:
S&P/TSX Capped Energy Index Fund
S&P/TSX Capped Financial Services Index Fund
S&P/TSX Capped Technology Index Fund
S&P/TSX Capped Basic Materials Index Fund
S&P/TSX Capped REIT Index Fund

See also
List of companies listed on the Toronto Stock Exchange
S&P/TSX 60

Notes

External links
 Reuters page for .GSPTSE
 S&P/TSX Composite index at Toronto Stock Exchange
 S&P/TSX Composite index at S&P Dow Jones Indices
 S&P/TSX Composite Index Profile on Wikinvest
 Bloomberg page for SPTSX:IND
 Top Companies in the S&P/TSX Composite

Canadian stock market indices
S&P Global